Fordon, is a district in Bydgoszcz, Kuyavian-Pomeranian Voivodeship, Poland and the number of residents is around 75,000. However, at the beginning, the district had only 8,000 residents. Currently, Fordon is the biggest district of Bydgoszcz.

House estates

Fordon is subdivided into 16 house estates:

- Stary Fordon
- Akademickie
- Bajka
- Bohaterów 
- Eskulapa
- Kasztelanka
- Łoskoń 
- Mariampol 
- Nad Wisłą 
- Niepodległości 
- Pałcz 
- Powiśle 
- Przylesie 
- Szybowników 
- Tatrzańskie 
- Zofin

History

In those times there was located an important defensive castle which was eventually fired and destroyed in 1330 by the Teutonic Knights.

At some point Fordon belonged to the Grand Duchy of Posen and later under direct Prussian control.  It was returned to Poland at the end of the First World War. In 1939 it was incorporated by the Nazi Germany. It is estimated that during World War II  German soldiers killed from 1200 to 3000 people, mainly Poles and Jews, in the Death Valley of Fordon (Valley of Death (Bydgoszcz)). The exact number stays unknown as historians have not found appropriate documents that would state the final number of deaths. In 1945 Fordon was liberated from Nazi occupation.

In 1950 Fordon was still a separate town from Bydgoszcz. At that time it was described as "seven miles east" of the latter city.  It had a population of 3,514 people and manufactured such things as cement and paper.  In 1973 Fordon became a part of the city of Bydgoszcz.

The prison in Fordon was established in 1780 and changed into men's/women's prison several times. From 1939-1956 among others, there were kept and killed 180 Ukrainian women in the prison. A memorial plaque was placed on the prison on May 10, 1992.

Buildings & Places

 Valley of Death
 Fordon Bridge
 Neogothic Church
 Centre of Oncology (Hospital)
 Synagogue from 17th century
 Prison
 Millennium Park

Education

Universities
 Wyższa Szkoła Informatyki - Ulica Fordońska 246
 Wyższa Szkoła Informatyki i Przedsiębiorczości w Bydgoszczy - Ulica Unii Lubelskiej
 Uniwersytet Kazimierza Wielkiego - Ulica Przemysłowa 34
 Politechnika Bydgoska im. Jana i Jędzrzeja Śniadeckich - Ulica Kaliskiego 7

High Schools
 Liceum Ogólnokształcące nr XIII (Zespoł Szkół nr 3) - Ulica Łowicka 45  
 Liceum Ogólnokształcące nr XV (Zespoł Szkół nr 5) - Ulica Berlinga 13  
 Liceum Ogólnokształcące nr XVI (Zespół Szkół Odzieżowych) - Ulica Fordońska 430  
 Liceum Ogólnokształcące Towarzystwa Salezjańskiego - Ulica Pod Reglami 1

Junior High Schools
 Gimnazjum nr 1 - Ulica Sielska 34
 Gimnazjum nr 2 - Ulica Kromera 11
 Gimnazjum nr 3 - Ulica Gawędy 1
 Gimnazjum nr 4 - Ulica Duracza 7  
 Gimnazjum nr 5 - Ulica Berlinga 17  
 Gimnazjum nr 53 (Zespół Szkół nr 5) - Ulica Berlinga 13
 Gimnazjum nr 7 - Ulica Kapliczna 7

Primary Schools
 Primary School nr 27 - Ulica Sielska 34
 Primary School nr 29 - Ulica Gawedy 5 
 Primary School nr 4 - Ulica Wyzwolenia 4
 Primary School nr 43 - Ulica Łowicka 45 
 Primary School 65 (filia) - Ulica Rzeźniackiego 7  
 Primary School 65 - Ulica Duracza 7
 Primary School nr 66 - Ulica Berlinga 3  
 Primary School nr 67 - Ulica Kromera 11  
 Primary School nr 9 - Ulica Tatrzanska 21 
 Szkoła Podstawowa Towarzystwa Salezjańskiego - Ulica Salezjańska 1

Sources
"Kujawsko-pomorskie dla każdego. Przewodnik turystyczny po najciekawszych miejscach województwa" Włodzimierz Bykowski, Wieńczysław Bykowski, wyd. Apeiron  & Towarzystwo Przyjaciół Dolnej Wisły , Bydgoszcz 2005

My Odyssey "Моя Одисея" Irena Tymoszko-Kaminska, Chicago 2005 page 286, Oficyna Wydawnicza UKAR 02-588 Warszawa 48, skr.poczt.156

External links
 Fordon website

Bydgoszcz
Neighbourhoods in Bydgoszcz
Holocaust locations in Poland